Harry Grey was an American writer.

Harry Grey may also refer to:
Harry Grey, 3rd Earl of Stamford (1685–1739), English peer
Harry Grey, 4th Earl of Stamford (1715–1768), English peer
Harry Grey, 8th Earl of Stamford (1812–1890), English peer
Harry George Grey, English missionary and theologian

See also
Harry Gray (disambiguation)
Henry Grey (disambiguation)
Harold Grey (born 1971), boxer